The George Becker House, near Los Ojos, New Mexico, was built in 1918–19.  It was listed on the National Register of Historic Places in 1985.

The house and historic outbuildings are located along the east side of La Puente Rd., south of Hatchery Rd., among fields and other buildings, just above the drop-off from
the first plateau to the river.

The house is stucco over wood frame, with half-timbering in its gable ends.

References

National Register of Historic Places in Rio Arriba County, New Mexico
Houses completed in 1918
Houses on the National Register of Historic Places in New Mexico
Barns on the National Register of Historic Places in New Mexico